The 2022 Colonial Athletic Association baseball tournament will be held at Walter C. Latham Park in Elon, North Carolina, from May 25 through 29.  The winner of  the tournament will earn the Colonial Athletic Association's automatic bid to the 2022 NCAA Division I baseball tournament.

Seeding and format
Continuing the format adopted in 2012, the top six finishers from the regular season will compete in the modified double-elimination tournament.

Bracket

Schedule

References

Tournament
Colonial Athletic Association Baseball Tournament
CAA baseball tournament
College baseball tournaments in North Carolina
Elon, North Carolina